Kraljevec na Sutli is a village and municipality in  Krapina-Zagorje County in Croatia. According to the 2011 census, there are 1,727 inhabitants in the area, absolute majority of which are Croats.

References

External links

Populated places in Krapina-Zagorje County
Municipalities of Croatia